İpsala District is a district of the Edirne Province of Turkey. Its seat is the town of İpsala. Its area is 741 km2, and its population is 26,148 (2022).

Composition
There are three municipalities in İpsala District:
 Esetçe
 İpsala
 Yenikarpuzlu

There are 19 villages in İpsala District:

 Aliçopehlivan
 Balabancık
 Hacı
 Hıdırköy
 İbriktepe
 Karaağaç
 Kocahıdır
 Korucu
 Koyuntepe
 Kumdere
 Küçükdoğanca
 Paşaköy
 Pazardere
 Sarıcaali
 Sarpdere
 Sultan
 Tevfikiye
 Turpçular
 Yapıldak

References

Districts of Edirne Province